Dracontomelon (Vietnamese: chi sấu) is a genus of flowering plants in the family Anacardiaceae, growing mostly in SE Asia and the Pacific islands.  The fruit may be used in local cuisine, especially as souring agents.

Species

Dracontomelon costatum Blume - Borneo, Sumatra
Dracontomelon dao Merr. & Rolfe (many synonyms) - SE Asia to Solomon Islands
Dracontomelon duperreanum Pierre (syn. D. sinense) - southern China & Vietnam 
Dracontomelon laoticum C.M.Evrard & Tardieu
Dracontomelon lenticulatum Wilkinson - New Guinea
Dracontomelon macrocarpum Li - China (Yunnan)
Dracontomelon petelotii Tardieu - northern Vietnam
Dracontomelon schmidii Tardieu - Vietnam
Dracontomelon vitiense  Engl. - Vanuatu, Fiji, Tonga, Western Samoa (Upolu)

Reclassified Species
The following are known synonyms:
Dracontomelon cuspidatum Blume: syn. of Dacryodes rostrata (Bl.) H. J. Lam
D. laoticum Evrard & Tardieu: syn. of Protium serratum (Wall. ex Colebr.) Engl.
D. pilosum Seem.: syn. of Dysoxylum mollissimum subsp. molle (Miq.) Mabb.
D. papuanum Lauterb.: syn. of Protium macgregorii (F.M.Bailey) Leenh.
D. multijugum Radlk. (formerly C.DC.): syn. of Toona ciliata var. multijuga (Kurz) Panigrahi & S.C.Mishra

Culinary Use
The most commonly eaten species is Dracontomelon duperreanum, which produces an edible fruit that is eaten in Cambodia, Vietnam and China. In Vietnamese, the plant is called cây sấu and is a common urban tree in Hanoi; the fruit is called quả sấu. The fruit is used in Vietnamese cuisine both as a souring agent and a candied treat similar to the Japanese umeboshi. The treat is popular among youths. In Chinese, the fruit is called 仁面.

References

External links

 
Anacardiaceae genera
Tropical agriculture
Tropical fruit